The Bannock tribe were originally Northern Paiute but are more culturally affiliated with the Northern Shoshone. They are in the Great Basin classification of Indigenous People. Their traditional lands include northern Nevada, southeastern Oregon, southern Idaho, and western Wyoming. Today they are enrolled in the federally recognized Shoshone-Bannock Tribes of the Fort Hall Reservation of Idaho, located on the Fort Hall Indian Reservation.

History

The Northern Paiute have a history of trade with surrounding tribes. In the 1700s, the bands in eastern Oregon traded with the tribes to the north, who by 1730 had acquired the horse. In the mid-18th century, some bands developed a horse culture and split off to become the Bannock tribe.  The horse gave the tribe a greater range, from Oregon to northern Nevada, southern Idaho, and western Wyoming.  They forayed from there on the Bannock Trail to Montana and Canada to hunt buffalo.

The Bannock have traditionally made pottery, utensils from bighorn sheep horns, and carrying bags from salmon skin. Their petroglyphs date back before European contact, and, after the introduction of glass beads, they transferred their geometric design to beadwork. For water transport, they have made tule reed rafts. Prior to the late 19th century, Bannock people fished for salmon on the Snake River in Idaho and in the fall, they hunted buffalo herds. Buffalo hides have provided material for tipis.

The Bannock are prominent in American history due to the Bannock War of 1878. After the war, the Bannock moved onto the Fort Hall Indian Reservation with the Northern Shoshone and gradually their tribes merged. Today they are called the Shoshone-Bannock. The Bannock live on the Fort Hall Indian Reservation, 544,000 acres (2,201 km²) in Southeastern Idaho. Lemhi and Northern Shoshone live with the Bannock Indians.

In the 2010 U.S. census, 89 people identified as having "Bannock" ancestry with 38 being "full-blooded". 5,315 people are enrolled in the Shoshone-Bannock Tribes of the Fort Hall Reservation, all of whom are designated "Shoshone-Bannock" (without more specific designation).

Notable Bannock people
 Mary Jo Estep, elementary music teacher and survivor of the Battle of Kelley Creek
 Sally Young Kanosh, adopted daughter of Brigham Young, wife of Kanosh
 Mark Trahant, journalist
 Randy'L He-dow Teton, model
 LaNada War Jack, leader of the Third World Strikes and the Occupation of Alcatraz, activist, tribal politician, and academic

Notes

References

External links

Shoshone-Bannock Tribes, Official Website
 List of Native American peoples in the United States

 
Indigenous peoples of the Great Basin
Native American tribes in Idaho
Native American tribes in Montana
Native American tribes in Oregon
Native American tribes in Wyoming